Surak, Iran is a city in Mazandaran Province, Iran.

Surak or Surk may also refer to:
 Surk, Chaharmahal and Bakhtiari
 Surak, Kerman
 Surak, Amol, Mazandaran Province
 Surak, Neka, Mazandaran Province
 Surak, Sistan and Baluchestan
 Surak, Yazd
 Surk-e Sofla, Yazd Province
 Surak Rural District, in Hormozgan Province